Alington is a surname, and may refer to:

 Vice Admiral Argentine Alington (-) British naval officer
 Cyril Argentine Alington (1872–1955), writer and headmaster of Eton College and Shrewsbury School
 Elizabeth Alington (1909–1990), wife of Prime Minister of the United Kingdom, Alec Douglas-Home
 Giles Alington (disambiguation), multiple people
 Henry Alington (1837–1928), English cricketer and cleric
 Hildebrand Alington, 5th Baron Alington (1641–1723)
 Rev. Hugh Alington, headmaster of Summer Fields School, Oxford, England
 Margaret Alington (1920–2012), New Zealand librarian, historian and author
 William Alington (died 1446), English statesman
 William (Bill) Alington (born 1929), New Zealand modernist architect
 William Alington, 1st Baron Alington (died 1648)
 William Alington, 3rd & 1st Baron Alington (died 1685)

See also
Baron Alington
Allington (disambiguation)